The 2022 AFL Women's season was the sixth season of the AFL Women's competition, the highest-level senior women's Australian rules football competition in Australia. The season was the last to feature 14 clubs, ran from 7 January until 9 April 2022, and comprised a ten-game home-and-away season, followed by a finals series featuring the top six clubs. It was the first of two seasons to take place in the 2022 calendar year, with the competition's seventh season held from August to November.

 won their third AFL Women's premiership, defeating  by 13 points in the 2022 AFL Women's Grand Final, played at Adelaide Oval.

Format
The season was formatted mostly the same as the previous season, with each of the fourteen clubs ranked on a single ladder and the top six teams qualifying for the three-week, single-elimination finals series. The only change was extension of the home-and-away season by an additional round, allowing each team to play 10 matches. The season was originally planned to start in December 2021, but in August 2021 it was decided to delay this to January 2022 in the hope of minimising COVID-19 pandemic interruptions. This was the last season to be contested by 14 teams, with the four remaining AFL clubs (and ) joining the AFLW competition in 2023.

Impact of COVID-19 pandemic

The 2022 season was played during the third year of the COVID-19 pandemic. At the start of the season, the roll-out of Australia's original two-dose vaccination program was almost complete with more than 90% uptake. Across all states except for Western Australia, most social and interstate travel restrictions which had been in place through the latter half of 2021 had been lifted; cases of the virus, particularly the omicron variant which became dominant in December 2021, were widespread in the community for the first time in the pandemic; and confirmed cases and their close contacts were still required to test and isolate, although for shorter periods than earlier in the pandemic. In contrast, Western Australia opened the season with very few virus cases in its community, and with its state borders closed to the rest of Australia, with a planned full reopening date of 5 February 2022 which was later changed to a restricted reopening, with the full reopening indefinitely delayed.

The main impacts of the pandemic to the AFLW season were:
 The league implemented a Vaccination Policy requiring all players and football department staff to be vaccinated against COVID-19; equivalent requirements were implemented by some state governments.
Late season matches were brought forward into this window to try to minimize the impact of the border restrictions, while the league received permission for teams to travel into Western Australia for matches after the opening.
 A match Rescheduling Policy was put in place to allow for a match to be rescheduled, redrawn or cancelled if one of its clubs was unable to field at least 21 players – including at least 16 from its primary list with five train-on players – due to absences from the team.

Premiership season
 All starting times are local time.
 Source for results and attendances: here

Round 1

Round 2

Round 3

Round 4

Round 5

Round 6

Round 7

Round 8

Round 9

Round 10

Ladder

Win/loss table

Bold – Home game
Opponent for round listed above margin
This table can be sorted by each team's aggregate winning/losing margin in any given round.

Finals series

Qualifying finals

Preliminary finals

Grand Final

Awards

League awards
The league best and fairest was awarded to Emily Bates of the Brisbane Lions, who polled 21 votes.
AFLW Players Association awards:
The most valuable player was awarded to Emily Bates of the Brisbane Lions.
The AFLW Coaches Association awards:
 The champion player of the year was awarded to Emily Bates of the Brisbane Lions.
Emma Kearney was named captain of the All-Australian team. Nine of the fourteen clubs had at least one representative in the 21-woman team.

Best and fairests

Leading goalkickers
Numbers highlighted in blue indicates the player led the season's goal kicking tally at the end of that round.
Numbers underlined indicates the player did not play in that round.

Source:

Coach changes

Club leadership

References

External links
 Official AFL Women's website

2022 AFL Women's season
AFL Women's seasons
AFL Women's season